Rita Maria Stroud (née Crudgington; born 8 March 1954), known professionally as Cheryl Baker, is an English singer and television presenter. She was a member of 1980s pop group Bucks Fizz, who won the 1981 Eurovision Song Contest and now performs under The Fizz. The group had 20 singles reach the UK top 60 between 1981 and 1988, including three number one hits with "Making Your Mind Up" (1981), "The Land of Make Believe" (1981) and "My Camera Never Lies" (1982). Baker left the group in 1993. She had previously represented the UK at the 1978 Eurovision Song Contest as a member of the band Co-Co.

In 2004, she began performing alongside Shelley Preston and fellow original Bucks Fizz member Mike Nolan as The Original Bucks Fizz. Preston was replaced by original Bucks Fizz member Jay Aston in 2009. Due to a legal dispute in 2011, the group renamed themselves Cheryl Baker, Mike Nolan and Jay Aston, formerly of Bucks Fizz. In 2017 they re-branded themselves as "The Fizz" and are working on new material.

Early career
Cheryl Baker was born as Rita Maria Crudgington on 8 March 1954 in Bethnal Green, London.  After leaving school and a series of secretarial jobs in the shipping industry, she began her professional singing career with the band Co-Co. The group entered A Song for Europe in 1976 with the song "Wake Up". They came second, being beaten by (eventual Eurovision winners) Brotherhood of Man by two points.

The group continued to perform together and in 1978, they entered A Song for Europe again with "The Bad Old Days". This time they won and went on to perform for the UK in Paris. The song managed 11th place – the lowest placing by a UK entry up to that point. The song became a hit single, reaching 13 in the UK Singles Chart. On the back of this, the group released their first (and only) album as well as further singles. None of these found any success.

In 1980, the group tried for Eurovision one more time. Now under a new name, The Main Event, their song "Gonna Do My Best" came last in A Song for Europe and soon afterwards, the group disbanded.

Bucks Fizz

A few months later, Baker was contacted by Nichola Martin, who was setting up a new group under the name Bucks Fizz, with a view to entering a song "Making Your Mind Up" into the Song For Europe in 1981. Joined by Mike Nolan, Bobby G and Jay Aston, Baker performed the song at the contest and won. On 4 April 1981, Baker represented the UK again at the Eurovision Song Contest. The song went on to win by a margin of four points and Bucks Fizz were catapulted into overnight stardom.

By winning the contest, Baker became only the third singer to represent the UK twice, following in the footsteps of Ronnie Carroll and Cliff Richard. This feat, however, was matched once again the following year, by Sally Ann Triplett. When Bucks Fizz went on to win the 1981 Eurovision Song Contest with the song "Making Your Mind Up", Baker thus became one of the few artists to take part in Eurovision to win at their second attempt. According to The Eurovision Song Contest – The Official History by John Kennedy O'Connor, Baker also made the second single biggest improvement by any Eurovision competitor in the contest, moving up from eleventh in 1978 to 1st in 1981.

"Making Your Mind Up" became a No.1 hit in many countries, including the UK and began a run of success for the group for the next five years. Baker along with the group toured the world and gained many hit singles and albums, including two more British No.1s; "The Land of Make Believe" and "My Camera Never Lies". Bucks Fizz became established as one of the biggest groups of the 1980s.

On 11 December 1984, Baker was involved in a serious crash in Newcastle upon Tyne, while on tour with the group, when the tour bus crashed into a lorry. She was injured and rushed to hospital. Although she broke three vertebrae in her spine, she made a speedy recovery. Colleague Mike Nolan, however, suffered serious head injuries, prompting Baker to help establish the 'HeadFirst' charity which supports crash victims, specifically those with head injuries. Baker continues to raise money for the charity.

Television career
In the mid-1980s, while still with the group, Baker embarked on a career in television presenting. She joined Record Breakers as a co-host alongside the long-serving Roy Castle in 1987, continuing alongside new hosts after Castle's death in 1994, finally leaving the show in 1997 after 10 years.

She also co-presented The Saturday Picture Show with Mark Curry from 1985 to 1986.

She continued her singing and television careers in tandem, although always maintained that singing was her first love. Bucks Fizz scored their final hit in 1988, and in the same year, Baker began presenting her own TV show Eggs 'n' Baker. This went on to run for five years.

During this time, she also released two solo singles "If Paradise Is Half as Nice" in 1987 and "Sensuality" in 1992, although neither of these found chart success.

Still touring with the group, Baker finally quit Bucks Fizz in December 1993 to concentrate on raising a family. After leaving Bucks Fizz, Baker carried on presenting Record Breakers as well as other television work. In 1997 she became the subject of the TV Biography show This Is Your Life. Into the 2000s, Baker made many guest appearances on television. She has also participated in a number of reality television shows, such as Drop the Celebrity (which she won), 24-Hour Quiz (which she also won) and I'm Famous and Frightened!.

For the Eurovision Song Contest 2005, she read out the points from the United Kingdom. In the EBU's 50th anniversary celebration of the show Congratulations, she introduced the song "Waterloo" by ABBA. Later on during the same programme, she sang Bucks Fizz's winning song "Making Your Mind Up" live with Mike Nolan and Shelley Preston.

In 2006, Baker played the role of Vi Moore in the London production of Footloose, the musical based on the 1984 motion picture of the same name, at the Novello Theatre. In 2009 she directed a youth production of Footloose in Sevenoaks, playing to sell out audiences. In 2007 she played the part of Ida in the musical Honk! and in 2008 she was seen in the role of Mrs Mayor in a touring production of Seussical the Musical. The tour visited many towns in the South East of England.

In June 2011, she reached the final of the ITV series Popstar to Operastar, where she was beaten into second place by Joe McElderry. In 2011, Baker appeared in an episode of All Star Family Fortunes. On 5 January 2013, Baker appeared on Celebrity Mastermind. She also appeared on The National Lottery: Who Dares Wins on 23 May 2015 with Dana Rosemary Scallon as her partner.

On 31 October 2017, Baker was confirmed as the second celebrity to take part in the tenth series of Dancing on Ice. She was eliminated on 4 February 2018.

Other work
Since 2004, Baker has been performing selected gigs with Nolan and Preston under the name The Original Bucks Fizz and alongside the other original members, Bobby G and Jay Aston, appeared in the video for Comic Relief's 2007 single, "I'm Gonna Be (500 Miles)". A Bucks Fizz CD with a bonus DVD, The Very Best of Bucks Fizz was released on 14 May 2007. A new CD of rare material The Lost Masters 2 – The Final Cut was released on 19 May 2008. In April 2009, Preston announced she was leaving The Original Bucks Fizz and has now been replaced by other original member Aston. This would be the first time Baker had performed with Aston since 1985.

Baker still raises money for HeadFirst and regularly makes personal appearances on behalf of the charity, such as on Celebrity Cash in the Attic in July 2008. She has also campaigned on behalf of IVF treatment and cleaner NHS hospitals.

In 2008, Baker became an Ambassador of Festival4Stars talent competition after she judged a national final. On 28 April 2009, she appeared on Loose Women to speak about the competition. During 2009 Baker toured with the musical Menopause.

In 2011, Baker undertook a mini tour of the UK with The Original Bucks Fizz, including a concert at the London Palladium on 11 July 2011. In 2012, The Original Bucks Fizz released the album Fame & Fortune?.

Baker is the vice-president of the stillbirth charity Abigail's Footsteps.

2016 - present 
Since 2016, Baker has been performing with fellow Bucks Fizz members Jay Aston and Mike Nolan (singer) under The Fizz. They perform sell out shows and have released several well-received albums.

Personal life
Baker has three brothers, Eddie, Colin and Gary, and a sister, Sheila. She married bass player Steve Stroud in Lewisham, London, on 25 January 1992. Their twin daughters, Kyla Olivia and Natalie Maria, were born in Westminster, London, on 20 June 1994. She lives in Ightham, Kent.
 
In 2006 she spoke out about her experiencing the menopause and resulting hair loss. She has also spoken of her weight fluctuations over the years. During 2010 and 2011 she took part in a diet and advertising campaign for Jenny Craig Inc., where after nine months had lost two-and-a-half stone. In association with this she ran and completed the London Marathon for the charity Head First.

References

External links
 CherylBaker.net
Bucks Fizz The Early Years
 
 The Original Bucks Fizz myspace page
 The website for the 2015 Paradise Regained Tour

1954 births
Living people
Eurovision Song Contest entrants for the United Kingdom
English television presenters
Eurovision Song Contest entrants of 1978
Eurovision Song Contest entrants of 1981
Eurovision Song Contest winners
People from Bethnal Green
Popstar to Operastar contestants
English women pop singers